Ian Edmund Bannen (29 June 1928 – 3 November 1999) was a Scottish actor with a long career in film, on stage, and on television. He was nominated for an Academy Award for his performance in The Flight of the Phoenix (1965), the first Scottish actor to receive the honour, as well as two BAFTA Film Awards for his performances in Sidney Lumet's The Offence (1973) and John Boorman's Hope and Glory (1987).

On stage, he was renowned for his interpretations of William Shakespeare and Eugene O'Neill, and was an original member of the Royal Shakespeare Company. He won the 1981 Critics' Circle Theatre Award for Best Supporting Actor for his performance in Brian Friel's Translations.

In 1979 he played Jim Prideaux in the BBC adaptation of Tinker Tailor Soldier Spy.

Early life
Bannen was born in Airdrie, Lanarkshire, the son of Clare (née Galloway) and John James Bannen, a lawyer. After attending St Aloysius' College, Glasgow and Ratcliffe College, Leicestershire, Bannen served in Egypt as a corporal in the British Army. His first acting role came in a 1947 Dublin stage production of Armlet of Jade. He became a successful figure on the London stage, making a name for himself in the plays of both Shakespeare and Eugene O'Neill. He was an original member of the Royal Shakespeare Company and appeared on Broadway.

Career
Bannen's film debut was in the early 1950s with a small role in Pool of London (1951), and he quickly rose to prominence, primarily in a wide range of supporting roles. He had a very significant role as Stoker Samuel Bannister in Yangtse Incident. During the early stages of his career he worked with the Boulting Brothers on Private's Progress and Carlton-Browne of the F.O.. His performance as Crow in The Flight of the Phoenix (1965 film) earned him an Academy Award nomination for Best Supporting Actor, making him the first Scottish actor to receive this honour; he also received a Golden Globe nomination for New Star of the Year - Actor. That same year, he starred alongside Sean Connery in the WWII prison drama, The Hill.

Director John Schlesinger cast him as a replacement for Alan Bates in the part of well-off homosexual doctor Daniel Hirsh in his controversial film Sunday Bloody Sunday (1971), after Bates was deemed unavailable to shoot. According to screenwriter Penelope Gilliatt, Bannen never felt comfortable with the part. The anxiety adversely affected his performance during the early filming. Schlesinger replaced Bannen with Peter Finch, who received an Oscar nomination for the role. Bannen later regretted this, saying not taking the role had set back his career.

In 1979 he played Jim Prideaux in the BBC adaptation of Tinker Tailor Soldier Spy.

Acclaim
Bannen received an Academy Award nomination in 1965 for Best Supporting Actor, for his performance in The Flight of the Phoenix as Ratbags Crow, one of the survivors of a plane crash. He also received a BAFTA Award nomination for Best Supporting Actor for his performance as suspected child molester Kenneth Baxter in The Offence (1973). He also won acclaim for his roles as Brother Benedict in Lamb (1986), Grandfather George in John Boorman's Hope and Glory (1987) (for which he received a second Best Supporting Actor BAFTA nomination), the elder Robert de Brus in Braveheart (1995) and as the touchingly crafty villager in Waking Ned Devine (1998).

In 1996, he was honoured with a Lifetime Achievement Award from BAFTA Scotland.

He was the subject of an episode of This is Your Life in 1999, when he was surprised by Michael Aspel.

Death
Bannen was killed, aged 71, in a car accident near Loch Ness in November 1999. He and his wife, Marilyn Salisbury, who had been driving, were discovered in an overturned vehicle in Knockies Straight between Inverness and Fort Augustus. Marilyn, a veterinarian for the Ministry of Agriculture, suffered only minor injuries. The couple had been married since 1978. They had no children. She died on 28 August 2019.

Legacy
Coatbridge College, Lanarkshire annually presents the Ian Bannen Memorial Award to the best actor or actress in its classes.

Bannen was posthumously given the 2000 Glenfiddich Spirit of Scotland Award.

Partial filmography

 Pool of London (1951) as Garage attendant (uncredited)
 The Dark Avenger (1955) as French Knight (uncredited)
 Private's Progress (1956) as Private Horrocks
 The Long Arm (1956) as The Young Workman
 Yangtse Incident: The Story of H.M.S. Amethyst (1957) as AB Bannister RN
 Miracle in Soho (1957) as Filipo Gozzi
 The Birthday Present (1957) as Junior Customs Officer 
 A Tale of Two Cities (1958) as Gabelle
 She Didn't Say No! (1958) as Peter Howard
 Behind the Mask (1958) as Alan Crabtree
 Carlton-Browne of the F.O. (1959) as Young King Loris
 A French Mistress (1960) as Colin Crane, The Headmaster's Son
 Suspect (1960) as Alan Andrews
 World in My Pocket (1961) as Kitson
 Station Six-Sahara (1962) as Fletcher
 Psyche 59 (1964) as Paul
 The Hill (1965) as Staff Sergeant Harris
 Mister Moses (1965) as Robert
 Rotten to the Core (1965) as Lt. Percy Vine
 Flight of the Phoenix (1965) as Crow
 Penelope (1966) as James B. Elcott
 The Sailor from Gibraltar (1967) as Alan
 Lock Up Your Daughters (1969) as Ramble
 Too Late the Hero (1970) as Pvt. Jock Thornton
 Jane Eyre (1970) as St. John Rivers
 The Deserter (1971) as British Army Capt. Crawford
 Fright (1971) as Brian
 Doomwatch (1972) as Dr. Del Shaw
 The Offence (1972) as Kenneth Baxter
 The Mackintosh Man (1973) as Slade
 From Beyond the Grave (1974) as Christopher Lowe (segment 2 "An Act of Kindness")
 Il Viaggio (1974) as Antonio Braggi
 The Driver's Seat (1974) as Bill
 The Gathering Storm (1974) as Adolf Hitler
 Bite the Bullet (1975) as Sir Harry Norfolk
 Sweeney! (1977) as Charles Baker
 Jesus of Nazareth (1977) as Amos
 The Inglorious Bastards (1977) as Col. Charles Thomas Buckner
  (1979) as The Professor
 The Watcher in the Woods (1980) as John Keller
 Eye of the Needle (1981) as Godliman
 Night Crossing (1982) as Josef Keller
 Gandhi (1982) as Senior Officer Fields
 Hart to Hart (1983) as Wallace Davenport
 The Prodigal (1983) as Riley Wyndham
 Gorky Park (1983) as Iamskoy
 Lamb (1985) as Brother Benedict
 Defence of the Realm (1985) as Dennis Markham
 Hope and Glory (1987) as Grandfather George
 La Partita (1988) as Father of Francesco
 The Courier (1988) as McGuigan
 The Lady and the Highwayman (1989) as Christian Drysdale
 Witch Story (1989) as Father Matthew
 George's Island (1989) as Captain Waters
 Circles in a Forest (1990) as MacDonald
 Ghost Dad (1990) as Sir Edith Moser
 The Big Man (1990) as Matt Mason
 Speaking of the Devil (1991) as Luzifer
 The Treaty (1991) as Davd Lloyd George
 The Sound and the Silence (1991) as Melville
 Murder in Eden (1991) as Canon Loftus
 Damage (1992) as Edward Llyod
 A Pin for the Butterfly (1994) as Grandpa
 Braveheart (1995) as Robert de Brus, 6th Lord of Annandale (the leper)
 Something to Believe In (1998) as Don Pozzi
 Waking Ned (1998) as Jackie O'Shea
 To Walk with Lions (1999) as Terence Adamson
 Best (2000) as Sir Matt Busby
 The Testimony of Taliesin Jones (2000) as Billy Evans (final film role)

References

External links

 Ian Bannen biography and credits at BFI ScreenOnline
 

1928 births
1999 deaths
20th-century British Army personnel
20th-century Scottish male actors
People educated at Ratcliffe College
People educated at St Aloysius' College, Glasgow
People from Airdrie, North Lanarkshire
Road incident deaths in Scotland
Royal Shakespeare Company members
Scottish male film actors
Scottish male Shakespearean actors
Scottish male television actors
Scottish Roman Catholics